Cypress Hills Interprovincial Park is a natural park in Canada straddling the Alberta / Saskatchewan boundary and jointly administered by the two provinces. Located south-east of Medicine Hat in the Cypress Hills, it became Canada's first interprovincial park in 1989.

Geography 

The Cypress Hills plateau rises up to 200 metres above the surrounding prairie, 
The "West Block" of the Cypress Hills spans the provincial boundary. Battle Creek runs through the central part of the park.

History

1931 - Cypress Hills Provincial Park was established in Saskatchewan.
1951 - Cypress Hills Provincial Park was established in Alberta.
1989 - On August 25, the governments of Alberta and Saskatchewan signed an agreement committing themselves to cooperation on ecosystem management, education, and park promotion.
2000 - Fort Walsh National Historic Site (located on the Saskatchewan side of the West Block) joined the collective. Together, these three partner agencies make up the park. Both Alberta and Saskatchewan provincial governments signed the Cypress Hills Interprovincial Park agreement, establishing the first interprovincial park in Canada.
2001 - On August 18, Vance Petriew discovered a comet from Cypress Hills during the Saskatchewan Summer Star Party.  The comet was later named 185P/Petriew.  
2004 - On September 28, Saskatchewan Parks, Alberta Community Development, Parks Canada and the Royal Astronomical Society of Canada signed an agreement that declared the park a dark-sky preserve.
2011 - On August 25, the Park opened the Cypress Hills Observatory and Yurt classroom.

Nature
Approximately 700 species of plants and animals thrive in the park, including 14 species of orchids.

The park protects the majority of the Cypress Hills landscape, which consists of three separate elevated blocks of lush forest and fescue grassland surrounded by dry mixed-grass prairie. The "west block" and "centre block" are protected as provincial parks, and are managed by Alberta Parks and Protected Areas and Saskatchewan Parks, respectively. The "east block" of the Cypress Hills, situated near Eastend, Saskatchewan, is not a park or protected area. The Fort Walsh National Historic Site is also located adjacent to the "west block".

Mammals 
There are five species of large hoofed mammals found in the park: wapiti, mule deer, white-tailed deer, and pronghorn.

Other mammals found in Cypress Hills Interprovincial Park include:

Eulipotyphla
 Masked shrew (Sorex cinereus)
 American pygmy shrew (Sorex hoyi)
 Wandering shrew (Sorex vagrans)

Lagomorpha
 Snowshoe hare (Lepus americanus)
 White-tailed jackrabbit (Lepus townsendii)
 Nuttall's cottontail (Sylvilagus nuttallii)

Chiroptera
 Hoary bat (Aeorestes cinereus)
 Big brown bat (Eptesicus fuscus)
 Silver-haired bat (Lasionycteris noctivagans)
 Eastern red bat (Lasiurus borealis)
 Small-footed myotis (Myotis ciliolabrum)
 Long-eared myotis (Myotis evotis)
 Little brown myotis (Myotis lucifugus)

Carnivora
 Coyote (Canis latrans)
 North American beaver (Castor canadensis)
 Black-tailed prairie dog (Cynomys ludovicianus)
 Thirteen-lined ground squirrel (Ictidomys tridecemlineatus)
 North American river otter (Lontra canadensis)
 Bobcat (Lynx rufus)
 Striped skunk (Mephitis mephitis)
 Stoat (Mustela erminea)
 Black-footed ferret (Mustela nigripes)
 Least weasel (Mustela nivalis)
 Long-tailed weasel (Neogale frenata)
 American mink (Neogale vison)
 Raccoon (Procyon lotor)
 Mountain lion (Puma concolor)
 American badger (Taxidea taxus)
 Northern pocket gopher (Thomomys talpoides)
 Swift fox (Vulpes velox)

Rodentia
 Ord's kangaroo rat (Dipodomys ordii)
 North American porcupine (Erethizon dorsatum)
 Sagebrush vole (Lemmiscus curtatus)
 Western meadow vole (Microtus drummondii)
 Gapper's red-backed vole (Myodes gapperi)
 Least chipmunk (Neotamias minimus)
 Bushy-tailed woodrat (Neotoma cinerea)
 Muskrat (Ondatra zibethicus)
 Northern grasshopper mouse (Onychomys leucogaster)
 White-footed mouse (Peromyscus leucopus)
 Western deer mouse (Peromyscus sonoriensis)
 American red squirrel (Tamiasciurus hudsonicus)
 Richardson's ground squirrel (Urocitellus richardsonii)
 Olive-backed pocket mouse (Perognathus fasciatus)
 Western jumping mouse (Zapus princeps)

Fish species
Fish species include walleye, yellow perch, northern pike, brook, brown, westslope cutthroat and rainbow trout, burbot, common carp, white sucker, and shorthead redhorse.

Activities

On the Alberta side of the west block, key park features include Head of the Mountain Viewpoint, the highest point between the Rocky Mountains and Labrador, the Elkwater townsite (a cottage community sitting at the same elevation as the Banff townsite), Horseshoe Canyon and Reesor Lake viewpoints (offering 100 km views on a clear day), over 50 km of hiking and mountain biking trails, and Hidden Valley Ski Area. Three lakes sit on the Alberta side of the park (Elkwater Lake, Spruce Coulee Reservoir and Reesor Lake), with another four in Saskatchewan (Harris, Adams, Coulee Lake, and Loch Leven).

All year long, park interpreters present education programs to school and youth groups, adult and seniors groups, and a wide range of park visitors.

There are also various rentals to be used in the park in the various months. In summertime, kayak, canoe, bicycle, and stand up paddle boards are available for rental. In the winter, kicksleds, snowshoes, skates, and cross-country skis may be rented. Winter camping is available and through Camp-Easy, yurts are available for rent.

See also
List of protected areas of Alberta
List of protected areas of Saskatchewan
List of Canadian protected areas
List of highest points of Canadian provinces and territories

References

External links 

Official Park website
A Road Trip To Cypress Hills
Cypress Hills Interprovincial Park

Cypress County
Provincial parks of Alberta
Provincial parks of Saskatchewan
Dark-sky preserves in Canada
Maple Creek No. 111, Saskatchewan
1931 establishments in Saskatchewan
1951 establishments in Alberta